Belmas or Belmás is a surname. Notable people with the surname include:

Juliet Caroline Belmas, Canadian anarchist activist and filmmaker
Lambert Belmas (born 1997), French rugby league player
Louis Belmas (1757–1841), French bishop
Mariano Belmás Estrada (1850–1916), Spanish architect
Xenia Belmas (c. 1890 – 1981), Russian soprano